Helminen is a Finnish surname. Notable people with the surname include:

Dwight Helminen (born 1983), American ice hockey player
Jouni Helminen, Finnish ten-pin bowler
Lars Helminen (born 1985), American ice hockey player
Markku Helminen (born 1946), Finnish motorcycle speedway rider
Raimo Helminen (born 1964), Finnish ice hockey player

Finnish-language surnames